The 2020–21 Minnesota Wild season was the 21st season for the National Hockey League franchise that was established on June 25, 1997. This was the first time since the 2005–06 season that Mikko Koivu was not on the roster after he signed a contract with the Columbus Blue Jackets. On December 20, 2020, the league temporarily realigned into four divisions with no conferences due to the COVID-19 pandemic and the ongoing closure of the Canada–United States border. As a result of this realignment, the Wild would play this season in the West Division and would only play games against the other teams in their new division during the regular season and potentially the first two rounds of the playoffs.

On April 24, 2021, the Wild clinched a playoff berth after a 6–3 win against the San Jose Sharks. They were eliminated from the playoffs with a 6–2 loss to the Vegas Golden Knights on May 28, after coming back from a 3–1 series deficit to force game seven.

Standings

Divisional standings

Schedule and results

Regular season
The regular season schedule was published on December 23, 2020.

Playoffs

Draft picks

Below are the Minnesota Wild's selections at the 2020 NHL Entry Draft, which was originally scheduled for June 26–27, 2020, at the Bell Center in Montreal, Quebec, but was postponed on March 25, 2020, due to the COVID-19 pandemic. It was held on October 6–7, 2020, virtually via video conference call from the NHL Network studios in Secaucus, New Jersey.

Notes

References

Minnesota Wild seasons
Wild
2020 in sports in Minnesota
2021 in sports in Minnesota